Olšany u Prostějova is a municipality and village in Prostějov District in the Olomouc Region of the Czech Republic. It has about 1,800 inhabitants.

Administrative parts
The village of Hablov is an administrative part of Olšany u Prostějova.

History
The first written mention of Olšany u Prostějova is in a deed of bishop Jindřich Zdík from 1141.

References

Villages in Prostějov District